The 2022–23 season is the 116th season in the existence of Rochdale Association Football Club and the club's second consecutive season in League Two. In addition to the league, the club also competed in the 2022–23 FA Cup, the 2022–23 EFL Cup and the 2022–23 EFL Trophy.

Statistics

Appearances and Goals

	

 

 

|}

Goals record

Disciplinary record

Transfers

In

Out

Loans in

Loans out

Pre-season and friendlies
Rochdale revealed an away pre-season trip to Scunthorpe United on 20 May 2022. Four days later, an away trip to Chester was added to the pre-season schedule. The club confirmed a visit to Darlington on 25 May. On June 1, a home friendly against Port Vale was added to the schedule.

Competitions

Overall record

League Two

League table

Results summary

Results by round

Matches

On 23 June, the league fixtures were announced.

FA Cup

Dale were drawn away to Bristol Rovers in the first round.

EFL Cup

Rochdale were drawn at home to Burton Albion in the first round and away to Sheffield Wednesday in the second round.

EFL Trophy

On 20 June, the initial Group stage draw was made, grouping Rochdale with Accrington Stanley and Salford City. Three days later, Liverpool U21s joined Northern Group D.

References

Rochdale
Rochdale A.F.C. seasons